Joseph Gormley, Baron Gormley, OBE (5 July 1917 – 27 May 1993) was President of the National Union of Mineworkers from 1971 to 1982, and a Labour peer.

Early life
Joe Gormley was born in Ashton-in-Makerfield, Lancashire in 1917, one of seven children, and became a miner at the age of fourteen. He was an active trade union official and became a committee member of the St Helens area branch of the National Union of Mineworkers (NUM) in 1957. He served as general secretary of the North West region (comprising Lancashire and Cumberland) from April 1961 and joined the national executive in 1963. He was appointed an Officer of the Order of the British Empire in the 1970 New Year's Honours. He was a fan of Wigan rugby league football club.

1970s
In 1971, he was elected as leader of the NUM and presided over the national strike that began on 9 January 1972. The strike lasted for seven weeks. After much negotiation the strike was resolved on 25 February 1972 with a 21% increase in pay and concessions won by the miners. Miners moved to the top of the UK's industrial wage league, having previously been seventeenth.

On 12 November 1973 the miners began an overtime ban in response to the Conservative government's incomes policy. Combined with the shortages caused by the Middle East oil crisis, Britain faced widespread power cuts. Emergency measures were used to economise on electricity with the introduction of the Three-Day Week. On 20 December Gormley attended negotiations with Willie Whitelaw, Secretary of State for Employment, and was forced to shelter in an Italian restaurant due to an IRA bomb scare. On 23 January 1974 the NUM executive met and agreed to hold a pithead ballot for an all-out strike, with Gormley writing, "With fuel stocks holding out and spring around the corner our final card has to be played now or never." On 4 February the NUM announced that the miners had voted for an all-out strike.

The Prime Minister, Edward Heath, called a snap election on this issue, asking the public, "Who governs Britain?" Gormley tried to persuade the National Executive Conference to postpone the strike until after any election, but the strike went ahead. After the election brought in a new Labour government, the union's demands were met.

1980s
In 1981, the Prime Minister, Margaret Thatcher, threatened to break with the 'Plan for Coal' and close 23 pits. A ballot for strike was held if the government closed pits contrary to the Plan for Coal. A strike mandate resulted with an 87.6% majority. The NUM Executive had a clear mandate for strike action if the government breached the Plan for Coal agreement. When a national strike was threatened, Thatcher backed down; many miners went on unofficial strike in the year, but Gormley rejected calls for a national strike. He left his post in 1982 and was replaced by the more left-wing Arthur Scargill. In 1982, his last-minute appeal got miners to accept a Government offer of a 9.3% raise, rejecting Scargill's call for a strike authorisation. When asked what he had achieved during his period as President, he replied, "Everyone wants to be related to a miner".

One of Gormley's long-term legacies which affected the 1984–85 strike was his role in the wage reforms of 1977. The reforms paid miners a wage proportionate to the output of their region. This gave Nottinghamshire miners the highest wages of all and so they were very reluctant to go on strike in 1984, when few of their pits were under threat and they had high wages to lose. Another key matter was that two ballots of the NUM membership had rejected these reforms, and Gormley responded by declaring productivity schemes now to be for the regional committees to decide, with or without a regional ballot. When this was challenged in the High Court as a violation of union rules, the court upheld Gormley. This confusion over when the NUM needed to hold a ballot became of huge importance during the 1984-85 strike, when Scargill tried to mimic Gormley's methods and make a national strike into something on which regional committees could decide.

He was made a life peer as Baron Gormley, of Ashton-in-Makerfield in Greater Manchester in the 1982 Birthday Honours.

He was the subject of This Is Your Life in 1982 when he was surprised by Eamonn Andrews on his way to a meeting in Victoria, London.

Special Branch
In 2002, the BBC uncovered that Gormley had worked for Special Branch by passing on information on extremism within his own union. A former Special Branch officer made this allegation and said that Gormley "loved his country. He was a patriot and he was very wary and worried about the growth of militancy within his own union". The BBC claimed, "Special Branch was talking to more than 20 senior trades union leaders during the early 1970s".

Autobiography

References

Further reading
 
 Morgan, Kenneth O. "Gormley, Scargill and the Miners" in Labour people: leaders and lieutenants, Hardie to Kinnock (1987) pp 289–300.

English miners
Presidents of the National Union of Mineworkers (Great Britain)
Officers of the Order of the British Empire
Labour Party (UK) life peers
People from Ashton-in-Makerfield
British intelligence operatives
1917 births
1993 deaths
Life peers created by Elizabeth II